Shaun White Skateboarding is a sports video game developed by Ubisoft Montreal and published by Ubisoft for Microsoft Windows, PlayStation 3, Wii and Xbox 360. It is a spin-off of the Shaun White Snowboarding duology.

Reception

The game received "mixed or average reviews" on all platforms according to video game review aggregator Metacritic.

In Japan, Famitsu gave the PlayStation 3 and Xbox 360 versions a score of one eight, one seven, and two eights, for a total of 31 out of 40.  One reviewer wrote: "The game's largely meant for casual users, and it's easy to break out a lot of different tricks. The story setup, which has you saving a city from evil with the power of your skateboard, is pretty funny. You have a lot of board and hat selections and so on when making a character, but I would have liked a few more facial types to choose from."  Another wrote, "The 'shaping' system was obviously pretty ambitious on the developer's part, but actually play it, and it doesn't really make much of a difference in gameplay. I wish there was more flash, or speed, or something to differentiate this from other games."

References

External links
 

2010 video games
White
White
Multiplayer and single-player video games
Multiplayer online games
PlayStation 3 games
Skateboarding video games
Ubisoft games
Video game spin-offs
Video games based on real people
Video games developed in Canada
Video games with stereoscopic 3D graphics
Wii games
Windows games
Xbox 360 games